Forest shrew may refer to various genera and species of shrews:

Genus Sylvisorex (forest shrews)
Forest shrews, the generic common name (in the plural) for genus Sylvisorex
 Cameroonian forest shrew (S. cameruniensis)
 Grant's forest shrew (S. granti)
 Howell's forest shrew (S. howelli)
 Bioko forest shrew (S. isabellae)
 Johnston's forest shrew (S. johnstoni)
 Moon forest shrew (S. lunaris)
 Mount Cameroon forest shrew (S. morio)
 Greater forest shrew (S. ollula)
 Lesser forest shrew (S. oriundus)
 Rain forest shrew (S. pluvialis)
 S. akaibei

Genus Myosorex (mouse shrews)
Forest shrew, the common name (in the singular) of M. varius
 Long-tailed forest shrew (M. longicaudatus)
 Dark-footed forest shrew, an obsolete name of the dark-footed mouse shrew (M. cafer)

Genus Crocidura (musk shrews)
Mossy forest shrew (C. musseri)

Animal common name disambiguation pages